The play-offs of the 2014 Fed Cup Americas Zone Group I were the final stages of the Group I Zonal Competition involving teams from the Americas. Using the positions determined in their pools, the seven teams faced off to determine their placing in the 2014 Fed Cup Americas Zone Group I. The top two teams advanced to World Group II Play-offs, and the bottom two teams were relegated down to the Americas Zone Group II.

Pool results

Promotion play-off 
The first placed teams of the two pools were drawn in head-to-head rounds. The winner advanced to the World Group II Play-offs.

Paraguay vs. Brazil

Relegation play-offs 
The bottom two teams of the two pools were drawn in head-to-head. The loser was relegated down to Americas Zone Group II in 2015.

Mexico vs. Ecuador

Venezuela vs. Bahamas

Final placements 

  advanced to World Group II play-offs.

References

External links 
 Fed Cup website

P1